Thiri Maha Dhamma Yaza Dipadi Dewi (born Khin Hpone Myint) was the chief queen consort of King Nyaungyan of Toungoo Dynasty of Burma (Myanmar). She married her half-brother Nyaungyan on 25 February 1577. Note that her personal name is sometimes reported as "Khin Hpone Myat".

The couple had four children:
 Thakin Lat: King of Burma (r. 1605–28)
 Thakin Gyi: King of Burma (r. 1629–48)
 Min Taya Medaw: Queen of Burma (r. 1609–28)
 Thakin Phyu: Crown Prince of Burma (r. 1635–47).

Notes

References

Bibliography
 
 

Chief queens consort of Toungoo dynasty
16th-century Burmese women
17th-century Burmese women